Curtis Versil Jarvis Jr. (born January 28, 1965 in Birmingham, Alabama) is a former American football defensive tackle in the National Football League. He was drafted by the Tampa Bay Buccaneers in the seventh round of the 1987 NFL Draft. He played college football at Alabama.

References

External links
Tampa Bay Buccaneers bio

1965 births
Living people
Players of American football from Birmingham, Alabama
American football defensive tackles
American football defensive ends
Alabama Crimson Tide football players
Tampa Bay Buccaneers players